The 1911 New Mexico A&M Aggies football team was an American football team that represented New Mexico College of Agriculture and Mechanical Arts (now known as New Mexico State University) during the 1911 college football season.  In their second year under head coach Art Badenoch, the Aggies compiled a 7–0 record, shut out six opponents, and outscored all opponents by a total of 193 to 6. The team played its home games on Miller Field, sometimes also referred to as College Field.

At the end of the season, three Aggies players were named to the All-Southwest football team selected by The Albuquerque Morning Journal: Richard Quesenberry (tackle); Roy Boat (end); and Samuel Bousman (fullback).

The game between New Mexico A&M and Arizona was played in El Paso, Texas, as part of the Statehood Football Tournament celebrating the admission of New Mexico and Arizona as the country's 47th and 48th states in early 1912.

Schedule

References

New Mexico AandM
New Mexico State Aggies football seasons
College football undefeated seasons
1911 in New Mexico